Brachyscome angustifolia is a former species name in the flowering plant genus Brachyscome.

Brachyscome angustifolia var. angustifolia is currently known as Brachyscome graminea.

The name Brachyscome angustifolia var. heterophylla is  currently referred to the following species:

Brachyscome brownii
Brachyscome formosa
Brachyscome kaputarensis
Brachyscome linearifolia
Brachyscome salkiniae
Brachyscome sieberi 
Brachyscome triloba
Brachyscome willisii

References

angustifolia
Historically recognized angiosperm taxa